Cairo Comix Con (also known as Cairo Comix Festival) is an annual comic book convention held in Cairo, Egypt which was established in 2015. A number of prizes are awarded at the festival, including Best Published Graphic Novel in Arabic, Best Digital Comic, Best Comics Magazine, and Best Comic Strip.

References

Comics conventions
Recurring events established in 2015
Culture in Cairo
Fan conventions
2015 establishments in Egypt